Eric Richard (born Eric Smith, 27 June 1940) is an English actor and presenter.

His theatre work includes plays at the Royal Court Theatre and the Theatre Royal, Stratford East, as well as seasons with the Royal Exchange, Manchester, Birmingham Repertory Theatre, Sheffield Crucible Theatre and Paines Plough. In 2001, he appeared as Ebeneezer Scrooge in a production of Charles Dickens' A Christmas Carol at the UCL Bloomsbury Theatre, London.

He is best known for his role as Desk Sergeant Bob Cryer in the long-running ITV drama The Bill, which he portrayed for twenty years from the show's inception in 1984; his television work has also included Shōgun, Victoria Wood As Seen on TV, Play for Today, Juliet Bravo, Made in Britain, Open All Hours, Games Without Frontiers, P'tang, Yang, Kipperbang, Shoestring, Casualty and Holby City. In 1991, he reviewed motorcycles for Top Gear.

In 2010, it was announced that Richard was to appear in the stage version of Lark Rise to Candleford which was on a nationwide tour at the time.

His two month-old grandson, Charlie Smith, was the youngest known British victim of the 2004 Indian Ocean Tsunami. He died in the arms of his father Richard after the wave hit them in Sri Lanka. They had sat down to eat when the water swept up into the restaurant.

In 2016, he starred in the short film Stutterer. The short film won the Academy Award for Best Live Action Short Film at the 88th Academy Awards. It was written and directed by Benjamin Cleary and produced by Serena Armitage and Shan Christopher Ogilvie. He also starred in Ben Rider's indie drama Forever Tomorrow.

He appears in the 2017 war film Dunkirk, under the credit Man at Railway Window.

In 2018, Richard appeared as Maurice in EastEnders.

References

External links

English male television actors
English male stage actors
1940 births
Living people
People from Margate
Male actors from Kent